Grace & Favour (American title: Are You Being Served? Again!) is a British sitcom and a spin-off of Are You Being Served? that aired on BBC1 for two series from 1992 to 1993. It was written by Are You Being Served? creators and writers Jeremy Lloyd and David Croft.

History
The idea of a spin-off was suggested by the cast of Are You Being Served? almost immediately after the original series ended in 1985. Lloyd and Croft liked the idea, but agreed that the department store format was exhausted and that any spin-off would require a change of location. Despite the enthusiasm of the original cast, it was almost seven years before Lloyd and Croft brought them back to television.

The plot line that brought the cast from the store to the manor was considered remarkably topical, since it aired just a few months after the death of British publishing tycoon Robert Maxwell, who was revealed to have borrowed heavily against his own employees' pensions.

Grace & Favour is different from Are You Being Served? in that it involves a continuous story arc, with certain plot elements, such as the relationship between Mr Humphries and Mavis Moulterd, unfolding throughout each episode. This in turn allowed the series to involve more complex storylines and subplots, making it possible to include returning guest stars and location shooting, neither of which was ever done on Are You Being Served?

The title of the series is a double play on words. A "grace and favour" is a home or other property owned by a monarch but given to the use of a faithful retainer upon retirement, as with the retired characters in this series. Grace is also the surname of the owner of Grace Brothers, the fictional department store where the characters previously worked and was also the previous owner of Millstone Manor.

International broadcasts

In the United States, the show was broadcast on PBS member stations as Are You Being Served? Again! in 1992. In a documentary included with the Are You Being Served? DVD box set, John Inman mentioned that he preferred the American title, and thought the programme may have performed better if that title was used in the UK as well.

In Australia, the show was broadcast on Network Ten in 1994.

Cast
Audio samples of Grace & Favour (media help)
The main cast included the five actors and characters who had appeared in every episode of Are You Being Served?.  These were Wendy Richard (Miss Brahms), John Inman (Mr Humphries), Mollie Sugden (Mrs Slocombe), Frank Thornton (Captain Peacock) and Nicholas Smith (Mr Rumbold).  

Of the other surviving Are You Being Served? cast members who had either left or joined the cast during the program’s run, only Trevor Bannister (Mr Lucas) was reportedly asked to join Grace & Favour, but declined.

Several new recurring characters were added to the show. Joanne Heywood as Miss Lovelock, Billy Burden as farmer Morris Moulterd, and Fleur Bennett as his daughter, Mavis, appeared in all 12 episodes. Michael Bilton, as Mr Grace's solicitor, Mr Thorpe, and his assistant, Miss Prescott, played by Shirley Cheriton, also played key roles in both series.

Cast list

Mollie Sugden as Mrs Betty Slocombe
John Inman as Mr Wilberforce Clayborne Humphries
Wendy Richard as Miss Shirley Brahms
Frank Thornton as Captain Stephen Peacock
Nicholas Smith as Mr Cuthbert Rumbold
Fleur Bennett as Mavis Moulterd
Joanne Heywood as Jessica Lovelock
Billy Burden as Morris Moulterd
Michael Bilton as Mr Thorpe
Shirley Cheriton as Miss Prescott
Gregory Cox as Mr Frobisher
Andrew Barclay as Malcolm Heathcliff
Diane Holland as Celia Littlewood
Andy Joseph as Joseph Lee
Eric Dodson as Sir Robert
Maggie Holland as Mrs Cleghampton

Plot line
The new series has the elderly and womanising "Young Mr Grace", head of Grace Brothers department store, recently deceased while scuba-diving on holiday in the Caribbean with his personal secretary, Miss Jessica Lovelock. As per the instructions in his will, the remaining workers in each department at Grace Brothers' closing sale find their pensions invested in different things. The members of the Men's and Ladies' Departments, along with Ms Lovelock, inherit the estate that is the locale of the show.

Young Mr Grace had invested their pension funds in a multitude of antiquated businesses, the largest of which is a country manor house called Millstone Manor. The will stipulates that they cannot sell the house and split the profits, but can use the property in the manner of their choosing. After a trip to Millstone Manor to view the property, where they also learn their pensions are minuscule, they decide to live in the manor in order to run it as an inn and live off the proceeds. Miss Lovelock, given accommodation in the grooms' quarters and charge of the horses, also lives at the manor much to the distress of Mrs Slocombe and Miss Brahms. Captain Peacock is not so bothered, however.

The series begins just after the funeral of Mr Grace, and quickly brings the cast to Millstone Manor. There they find Mr Rumbold having trouble trying to find new staff after telling the previous staff "in no uncertain terms" that if they did not straighten up they could leaveand they left. With time running out, the old Grace Brothers employees are obliged to "stand in" for the staff in order to have their picture taken as the inn staff for a travel brochure. Soon they find that they are running the inn themselves with the help of Mr Moulterd, who manages the manor's farm, and his daughter Mavis, who helps out at the manor.

With Mr Humphries forced by circumstance to share a bed with Mavis, he finds that she develops a bit of a crush on him. This series of events leads all of the cast to assume they are having an affair, which flatters Mr Humphries, though he denies any such goings-on. Despite these events, Mr Humphries continues to be rather ambivalent to the idea of a relationship with anyone. A young man from the village vies with Humphries for Mavis' affection, and frequently attempts to intimidate him by threatening him with violence.

On her first day in the country, Mrs Slocombe tries to move a gypsy's wagon that blocked the road and ends up charged with wagon theft, narrowly avoiding a charge of indecent exposure since there was "just a flash" as the out-of-control wagon raced past the post office. At her trial, all of her colleagues are called as witnesses, but it is Mr Moulterd who ends up winning the case for her. Mrs Slocombe is grateful, despite her irritation that he brings up their sexual relationship during the War, which she insists never happened. Also notable is the unexpected appearance of the oft alluded to, but never-before-seen Mr Slocombe, from whom Mrs Slocombe seeks to hide her identity.

Other events include the staff putting on a traditional harvest festival dance for octogenarian American visitors and putting on a showcase of British arts and culture for a tour group from Mongolia.

Episode 1 of Series 2 contains a number of satirical references to the wrongful conviction and hanging of Derek Bentley for the murder of a policeman. The case revolved around the issue of whether Bentley's words "Let him have it, Chris" to his associate Christopher Craig were meant literally ("Let him have the gun") or figuratively ("Open fire!"). The case had been widely publicised and was the subject of a film titled Let Him Have It starring Christopher Eccleston a few years before the show was made.

Episodes

Series 1 (1992)

Series 2 (1993)

Home media
All regions released contain both series of Grace & Favour in one set.

Location filming
All external filming for the series was undertaken in and around Tetbury in Gloucestershire.  Primary filming was at Chavenage House, which was used for Millstone Manor, just outside Tetbury.

References

External links

1992 British television series debuts
1993 British television series endings
1990s British sitcoms
 
BBC television sitcoms
David Croft sitcoms
English-language television shows
British television spin-offs
Television series by BBC Studios